Bitter Life refers to:

 Bitter Life (TV series), Turkish TV series
 Bitter Life (film), 1962 Turkish film